Wu'an is a county-level city in the southwest of Hebei Province, China, bordering Shanxi Province to the west. It is under the administration of the prefecture-level city of Handan.

History

People's Republic
In August 1949, Wu'an was one of three counties to be detached from Handan and attached to Pingyuan Province. In 1952, as Pingyuan dissolved, Wu'an returned to Handan.

Administrative divisions
As of 2005, Wu'an had a population of approximately 66,000.

Towns
Wu'an Town, Kang'ercheng, Niuji, Cishan, Baiyan, Shucun, Datong, Wu'an, Yicheng, Kuangshan, Hejin, Yangyi, Paihui, Yetao

Townships
Shangtuancheng Township, Bei'anzhuang Township, Bei'anle Township, Xitushan Township, Xisizhuang Township, Huoshui Township, Shidong Township, Guantao Township, Majiazhuang Township

Climate

References

External links

County-level cities in Hebei
Handan